The Banu Bakr bin Wa'il, or simply Banu Bakr, were an Arabian tribe belonging to the large Rabi'ah branch of Adnanite tribes, which also included Abd al-Qays, Anazzah, Taghlib.  The tribe is reputed to have engaged in a 40-year war before Islam with its cousins from Taghlib, known as the War of Basous. The pre-Islamic poet, Tarafah was a member of Bakr.

Bakr's original lands were in Najd, in central Arabia, but most of the tribe's bedouin sections migrated northwards immediately before Islam, and settled in the area of Upper Mesopotamia, on the upper Euphrates. The region of Diyar Bakr, and later the city of Diyarbakır in southern Turkey, take their names from this tribe.

The tribe is distinct from the tribe of Bani Bakr ibn Abd Manat, who lived in the Hejaz and had important interactions with Muhammad.

History

Muhammad's era

During the Islamic Prophet Muhammad's era the Banu Bakr tribe was involved in various military conflicts.

Branches
The following are some of the related and sub-tribes of Bakr ibn Wa'il in the pre-Islamic and early-Islamic eras:
 Adnanite, Hejaz or "Northwestern Arabian" (Northern Arabian Red Sea coast)
 Rabi`ah (ربيعة), migrated northwards and eastwards from Hejaz, for example to Diyar Rabi'a in Al-Jazira, Mesopotamia
 Bakr ibn Wa'il, Al-Yamama, bedouin sections migrated before Islam to Diyar Bakr in Al-Jazira.
 Banu Hanifa - mostly sedentary, were the principal tribe of Al-Yamama.
 Banu Shayban - mostly nomadic (bedouin), led the Battle of Dhi Qar against the Sassanid Persians in southern Iraq prior to Islam.  The jurist Ahmad ibn Hanbal claimed descent from this tribe.
 Banu Qays ibn Tha'labah - bedouin and sedentary, were the inhabitants of the town of Manfuha (now part of Riyadh).  The pre-Islamic poets al-A'sha and Tarafah were among its members.
 Banu Yashkur - bedouin and sedentary, inhabitants of Al-Yamama. Al-Harith ibn Hillizah, one of the purported authors of the Seven Hanged Poems of pre-Islamic Arabia, was a member of Yashkur.
 Banu 'Ijl - mostly bedouin, located in Al-Yamama and the southern borders of Mesopotamia.
 Banu Dhuhal
 Abdul Qays
 Anazzah
In eastern Najd:
 Taghlib ibn Wa'il, migrated northwards to the Jazirah plain in northern Mesopotamia in the 6th century.
 Anz ibn Wa'il
 al-Nammir ibn Qasit

References

 
Tribes of Arabia
Tribes of Saudi Arabia
Bakr